65 electorate members of the New Zealand House of Representatives were elected in the general election on 12 October 1996.

General electorates
Unless otherwise noted the information is sourced from here:

Albany

!colspan=6|Retiring incumbents and withdrawn candidates
|-

|}

Aoraki

|}

Auckland Central

|}

Banks Peninsula

|}

Bay of Plenty

|}

Christchurch Central

!colspan=6|Retiring incumbents and withdrawn candidates
|-

|}

Christchurch East

|}

Clutha-Southland

|}

Coromandel

!colspan=6|Retiring incumbents and withdrawn candidates
|-

|}

Dunedin North

|}

Dunedin South

|}

Epsom

|}

Hamilton East

|}

Hamilton West

|}

Hunua

|}

Hutt South

|}

Ilam

|}

Invercargill

|}

Kaikoura

|}

Karapiro

|}

Mahia

|}

Mana

|}

Mangere

|}

Manukau East

|}

Manurewa

|}

Maungakiekie

|}

Napier

|}

Nelson

|}

New Lynn

|}

New Plymouth

|}

North Shore

|}

Northcote

|}

Northland

|}

Ohariu-Belmont

|}

Otago

|}

Otaki

!colspan=6|Retiring incumbents and withdrawn candidates
|-

|}

Owairaka

!colspan=6|Retiring incumbents and withdrawn candidates
|-

|}

Pakuranga

|}

Palmerston North

|}

Port Waikato

!colspan=6|Retiring incumbents and withdrawn candidates
|-

|}

Rakaia

|}

Rangitikei

|}

Rimutaka

|}

Rodney

|}

Rongotai

|}

Rotorua

|}

Tamaki

|}

Taranaki-King Country

!colspan=6|Retiring incumbents and withdrawn candidates
|-

|}

Taupo

|}

Tauranga

|}

Tukituki

|}

Waimakariri

|}

Waipareira

|}

Wairarapa

|}

Waitakere

|}

Wellington Central

|}

West Coast-Tasman

|}

Whanganui

|}

Whangarei

|}

Wigram

|}

Maori electorates

Te Puku O Te Whenua

|}

Te Tai Hauauru

|}

Te Tai Rawhiti

|}

Te Tai Tokerau

|}

Te Tai Tonga

|}

References

Candidates 2020
1996 New Zealand general election